Konstantinos Chatzipirpiridis (born 1 May 2001) is a Greek professional footballer who plays as a right winger for Austrian club SK Bischofshofen.

Career statistics

References

2001 births
Living people
Greek footballers
Super League Greece players
Aris Thessaloniki F.C. players
Association football midfielders
Footballers from Thessaloniki
Expatriate footballers in Austria
Olympiacos Volos F.C. players
Greek expatriate sportspeople in Austria
Greek expatriate footballers
Iraklis Thessaloniki F.C. players